Bolero is a 1985 album by Yugoslav/Croatian band Haustor. It is considered to be one of their best albums.

The album has 8 songs, and notable hits are Ena, "Shane" (sc. Šejn), "Sejmeni" and "Silk shawl" (sc. Šal od svile).

Background 
The recording of this album took place from December 1984 to June 1985. Actor Rade Šerbedžija appeared as a guest on this album. The back cover was created by Rundek himself.

There are videos for Ena (3 versions), Šejn, Take the money and run and Sejmeni.

Track listing

Trivia 
For years it has been rumoured who could be Ena from the song of the same name.

References 

1985 albums
Jugoton albums